Raffaella Bosurgi is a neuroscientist and the Executive Editor of PLOS Medicine.

Education 
Bosurgi has a master's degree in environmental technology from Imperial College London and a Ph.D in neuroscience from University College London and the University of Freiburg.and a postdoctoral fellowship from EMBL in Rome

Career 
Bosurgi worked as a postdoctoral researcher on anxiety and depression at the European Molecular Biology Laboratory in Rome before working for an Italian energy company on renewable energy projects in Italy and low income countries.

She has previously edited The Lancet Infectious Diseases and The Lancet Gastroenterology before becoming the first editor in chief for The Lancet Planetary Health from 2017 to 2019. She later worked at The BMJ as the quality improvement editor.

Bosurgi became the Executive Editor of PLOS Medicine in 2021.

Selected publications 

 Lukoye Atwoli, Abdullah H Baqui, Thomas Benfield, Raffaella Bosurgi, Fiona Godlee, Stephen Hancocks, Richard Horton, Laurie Laybourn-Langton, Carlos Augusto Monteiro, Ian Norman, Kirsten Patrick, Nigel Praities, Marcel G M Olde Rikkert, Eric J Rubin, Peush Sahni, Richard Smith, Nick Talley, Sue Turale, Damián Vázquez, Call for emergency action to limit global temperature increases, restore biodiversity, and protect health: Wealthy nations must do much more, much faster, Nutrition Reviews, Volume 79, Issue 11, November 2021, Pages 1183–1185, https://doi.org/10.1093/nutrit/nuab067

References 

Medical journal editors
Alumni of Imperial College London
Alumni of University College London
University of Freiburg alumni
Living people
Italian women neuroscientists
Year of birth missing (living people)